Simon Munyutu (born 27 December 1977 in Nakuru, Kenya) is a French athlete who specialises in the men's marathon. Munyutu competed at the 2008 Summer Olympics.
 
He is married to Martha Komu, a Kenyan runner who lives in France but, unlike him, keeps representing Kenya. They both competed at the 2008 Olympics, but for different countries. They have a daughter born in 2005.

References 
 sports reference

1977 births
Living people
French male marathon runners
French male long-distance runners
Olympic athletes of France
Kenyan emigrants to France
Athletes (track and field) at the 2008 Summer Olympics